Colonel Ronald Bruce Campbell  (1878–1963) was a British Army officer and Olympic fencer.

Biography
Born in Madras, India, on 14 September 1878, Ronald Bruce Campbell was educated at Bedford School and at the University of Edinburgh.  He served in the British Army during the Second Boer War, between 1900 and 1901, and during the First World War, between 1914 and 1918, and was promoted to the rank of colonel in the Gordon Highlanders in 1922.

Colonel Ronald Bruce Campbell was invested as a Companion of the Distinguished Service Order in 1917, and as a Companion of the Order of the British Empire in 1923.

He competed in fencing for Great Britain in the 1920 Summer Olympics. In 1929, he won the sabre title at the British Fencing Championships.

He died in Perth, Scotland, on 7 March 1963.

Publications
A Ten Round Contest, 1926,
The Foster Brothers, 1935,
The Spirit of the Fist, 1951

References

1878 births
1963 deaths
British male fencers
Martial artists from Chennai
People educated at Bedford School
Alumni of the University of Edinburgh
Olympic fencers of Great Britain
Fencers at the 1920 Summer Olympics
Commanders of the Order of the British Empire
Companions of the Distinguished Service Order
British Army personnel of the Second Boer War
British Army personnel of World War I
British people in colonial India